Cornelis Hendriksz Vroom (1591, Haarlem - buried 16 September 1661, Haarlem) was a Dutch Golden Age landscape painter.

Biography
According to the Netherlands Institute for Art History, he was the son of the painter Hendrick Cornelisz Vroom, the older brother of Frederick and Jacob, and the father of the painter Jacob Cornelisz Vroom. He became a member of the Haarlem Guild of St. Luke in 1634.

According to Arnold Houbraken in 1718, who repeated a list of names from Theodorus Schrevelius's 1648 book on Haarlem called Harlemias, he was the son of Hendrick Cornelisz Vroom and a good landscape painter of Haarlem along with "Joh. Jakobsz.", who was in Italy for many years, "Nicol. Zuyker", Gerrit Claesz Bleker, Salomon van Ruysdael, and Reyer van Blommendael.

Like his father, Vroom is best known for his landscapes and seascapes.

He was a strong influence on fellow local Haarlem landscapist Jacob van Ruisdael.

References

 Cornelis Hendriksz. Vroom on Artnet
 Cornelis Hendrikszoon Vroom or looking at ultimate space
 

1591 births
1661 deaths
Artists from Haarlem
Dutch Golden Age painters
Dutch male painters
Dutch landscape painters
Dutch marine artists
Painters from Haarlem